Caroline Fleming (born Baroness Caroline Elizabeth Ada Iuel-Brockdorff, 9 September 1975) is a Danish noble entrepreneur, model, television personality, who was the owner of Valdemar's Castle from 2003 to 2011.

Early life
Fleming was born and raised in Valdemar's Castle on Tåsinge as the daughter of Baron Niels Krabbe Juel-Brockdorff and Baroness Margaretha Juel-Brockdorff. She is the 11th generation of landowners in a straight line after the naval hero Niels Juel.

Career

Fleming has made a perfume series of "Eau de Vie" and "Eau de Vie: Josephine" named after her daughter, Josephine Victoria. She has published two Danish cookbooks, Baronessen går i køkkenet (The Baroness in the Kitchen, 2010) and Baronessens sunde fastfood (The Baroness's Healthy Fastfood, 2010) as well as one English cookbook, Cook Yourself Happy: The Danish Way.

Fleming has also appeared in television shows, including Baronessen flytter ind (The Baroness Moves In) and Danmarks Næste Topmodel, both on Kanal 4. From 2015 to 2017, she appeared in the reality television series Ladies of London.

Personal life
From 2001 to 2008, Fleming was married to banker Rory Fleming, first cousin once removed of James Bond writer Ian Fleming, with whom she has two children, Alexander (b. April 2004) and Josephine (b. December 2006). Her daughter's godmother is Mary Donaldson, the crown princess of Denmark who is originally from Australia.

Fleming met footballer Nicklas Bendtner when she was filmed renovating her family home Valdemar's Castle on a reality show. In December 2010, Fleming gave birth to Bendtner's son at London's Portland Hospital.

In 2017, Fleming fell in love with French entrepreneur Hervé Larren, it is reported that the couple met in Los Angeles while she was promoting her book "Cook Yourself Happy". On August 22, 2018 Larren was by her side at Valdemar's Castle for the funeral of her grandmother.

References

1975 births
Living people
People from Svendborg Municipality
Danish expatriates in England
21st-century Danish businesswomen
21st-century Danish businesspeople
Participants in American reality television series
Women cookbook writers
Cookbook writers
Danish women writers
Danish baronesses
Brockdorff family